Travels in Norway: A bibliographical essay was an 1897 bilingual annotated bibliography by Hjalmar Pettersen. It featured short individual entries for foreigners' travels in Norway with eventual travel reports listed. It was part of the yearbook series of the University Library of Oslo, with many sources from foreign libraries.

References

External links
Digital scan by the National Library of Norway

1897 books
Published bibliographies